Bryennios or Bryennius, feminine form Bryennissa (Βρυέννισσα), was the name of a noble Byzantine family which rose to prominence in the 11th and 12th centuries, mostly as military commanders. The etymology of the name is uncertain. The first members of the family appear in the 9th century, with the strategos Theoktistos Bryennios. None are known for the 10th, but they reappear in the latter half of the 11th century, when they rose to high military commands and became associated with the Komnenian dynasty. Members of the family retained high positions through the 12th century, and are documented up to the 15th century.

Notable members 
 Alexios Bryennios, megas doux in 1156
 Joseph Bryennios (c. 1350 – 1430), Byzantine monk and writer
 Manuel Bryennios (fl. 1300), Byzantine scholar
 Nikephoros Bryennios (ethnarch) (fl. 1050s), Byzantine general
 Nikephoros Bryennios the Elder (fl. 1070s), Byzantine general, son of the ethnarch, who made an attempt on the throne of Michael VII Doukas in 1077–1078
 Nikephoros Bryennios the Younger (1062–1137), son or grandson of the preceding, Byzantine general, statesman and historian, husband of Anna Komnene
 Theoktistos Bryennios, (fl. 842), strategos of the Peloponnese

Sources